Discofrontia is a monotypic snout moth genus in the family Pyralidae. Its single species, Discofrontia normella, is found in South Africa. The genus was described by George Hampson in 1891, but the species was described by the same author in 1901.

References

Endemic moths of South Africa
Anerastiini
Monotypic moth genera
Moths of Africa
Pyralidae genera
Taxa named by George Hampson